Li Jian (born 5 February 1986 in Nanjing, China) is a Chinese-born Hong Kong former professional footballer.
His position is striker and is famous for his high speed.
Before come to Hong Kong, he played for Wenzhou Provenza in China.

References

External links
Li Jian at HKFA

1986 births
Living people
Chinese footballers
Chinese expatriate footballers
Hong Kong footballers
Hong Kong expatriate footballers
Association football forwards
Hong Kong First Division League players
Hong Kong Premier League players
Expatriate footballers in Hong Kong
Sportspeople from Nanjing
Footballers from Jiangsu
Yokohama FC Hong Kong players
TSW Pegasus FC players
Hong Kong Rangers FC players
Happy Valley AA players